Joaquín Alberto Montecinos Naranjo (born 7 December 1995) is a professional footballer who plays as a winger for Liga MX club Tijuana. Born in Colombia, he represents the Chile national team.

Club career

In his early career he was with Deportes La Serena, but he was released and then joined Unión Temuco in the Primera B de Chile, making his professional debut at the age of 16. After returning to La Serena, while playing in the Primera B, the Chilean second division, Montecinos had the chance to play for a Chilean top flight team but got injured. 

In 2017, he trialed with Celaya in Mexico but never signed because of economic issues.

In 2019, he signed for Deportes Melipilla, another second division team despite offers from the top flight, due to "wanting to go through stages, without rushing".

In 2022, Montecinos was loaned to Liga MX club Tijuana on a deal for a year with an option to buy. In July 2022, the option to buy was made and he was transferred on a deal until 2025.

International career
At the age of 18, he represented Chile U21 at the 2014 Toulon Tournament, making two appearances. In addition to this, he was part of the training sessions of Chile U20 for the 2015 South American U-20 Championship.

Despite he was born in Colombia, he stated his desire to play for the Chile senior team. So, he was called up to the Chile senior team for the 2022 FIFA World Cup qualifiers in October 2021. He debuted for Chile in a 2–0 loss to Peru on 7 October 2021.

Personal life
Montecinos is the son of the Chilean former international footballer Cristián Montecinos and he was born when his father played for Junior de Barranquilla.

References

External links
 

1995 births
Living people
Sportspeople from Barranquilla
Chilean footballers
Chile international footballers
Chile youth international footballers
Chilean expatriate footballers
Colombian footballers
Colombian people of Chilean descent
Naturalized citizens of Chile
Association football midfielders
Unión Temuco footballers
Deportes La Serena footballers
San Luis de Quillota footballers
Deportes Melipilla footballers
Audax Italiano footballers
Club Tijuana footballers
Primera B de Chile players
Chilean Primera División players
Liga MX players
Expatriate footballers in Mexico
Chilean expatriate sportspeople in Mexico
Citizens of Chile through descent